The Minolta 9000 AF is a professional Single-lens reflex autofocus camera, introduced by Minolta in August 1985. It was both Minolta's and the world's first professional autofocus SLR. It was called Minolta Maxxum 9000 in the US and Minolta α-9000 in Japan.

As the first professional autofocus SLR system ever made, the Minolta 9000 AF sports a number of unique features showing the transition from electro-mechanical cameras to the next generation of fully electronic cameras. For instance, it is the only autofocus system ever made with a manual film transport rather than automatic electronic winding.

History 
In the early 1980s, Minolta was developing several ranges of autofocus SLR cameras, with the Minolta 7000 aimed at the advanced amateur market, and the Minolta 9000 aimed at the professional market. Development on the Minolta 9000 was completed before that of the Minolta 7000, but for marketing purposes, the 9000 was held back and the 7000 was launched first in February 1985. For this reason, the 7000 is often considered to be the first ever autofocus-capable SLR

In any case, the Minolta 9000 AF was the first professional SLR system featuring a wide range of autofocus-capable accessories, with the New York Times calling it "The first 35-millimeter automatic-focusing camera built for professional use" and "revolutionary", and Leif Ericksenn, editor-in-chief of Photo Methods magazine calling it "one of the most astonishing cameras of the decade".

At the time of its introduction, the Minolta 9000 retailed for $684 (circa $1580 in 2017).

Characteristics 
The body of the Minolta 9000 is a robust all-metal construction, with the pentaprism being the only component not to be completely encased in metal. The shutter was capable of the then-extremely short exposure time of 1/4000 seconds, as well as of 1/250 second synchronisation.

The exposure meter provided the user with the usual range of automatic exposure modes: automatic, shutter priority, aperture priority and manual mode. As metering modes, it was capable of centre-weighted integral metering and spot metering; spot metering could be further refined with light and shadow corrections, which used an exposure memory to correct exposure by up to 2.3 EV. Furthermore, an optional back "program back super 90" (PBS-90) provided multi-spot measurements, with optional automatic weighting by average (AVERAGE), mean (CENTER), highlight (HIGHLIGHT) and shadow (SHADOW), as well as user-definable program curves. The backs also provided automatic bracketing.

The autofocus allowed not only quick focusing on static subjects, but also continuous focus.

The Minolta 9000 also accepted a variety of focusing screens, a lockable button for depth of field preview, lighting of the viewfinder and a built-in eyepiece to protect the eye of the photographer from lateral light.

The Minolta 9000 was compatible with Minolta AF accessories, including a full range of lenses in Minolta A-mount, flash units, and various other accessories such as a 5-frame/second motor winder, a 100-exposure magazine and several backs. One of these, available only in Japan, was a 0.38 mega-pixel digital sensor, called the "Still Video Back" ( SB-90 / SB-90S ), which recorded images on Video Floppies.

Specifications 
 Type: Fully automatic SLR camera body (exception: manual film advance) made of aluminium, brass and steel.
 Manufacturer: Minolta
 Year of launch: 1985
 Film: DX-coded 35mm film with speeds from 6 to 6400 ASA
 Lens mount: Minolta A-mount
 Focusing: TTL phase detecting autofocus
 Shutter: Aluminium focal plane shutter with speeds 30 sec. to 1/4000 sec.
 Metering: TTL through combined ambient and flash metering cells located at the bottom of the mirror box (therefore, not influenced by the focusing screens used), center-weighted or spot-metering metering characteristics for ambient light, center-weighted for flash light
 Exposure: Program controlled mode, manual mode, aperture priority or shutter priority mode
 Flash: PC-socket plus TTL-enabled hot shoe for Minolta AF-flashes, shutter synchronized for speeds up to 1/250 sec.
 Finder: Pentaprism finder, diopter correction, 94% coverage at 0.81x magnification
 Display: LCD displays on body and in the view finder
 Film advance: Manual lever and rewind crank, add-on winder (2fps, manual rewind) and motordrive (5fps,  motorized rewind) units available
 Weight: 
 Dimensions: 53×92×139 mm

Sources and references

Notes

Citations

External links 

 Minolta Maxxum 9000 manual The unofficial Minolta 9000 information central
 Minolta 9000, cjo.info
 Minolta 9000, tammesphotography
  Minolta Maxxum 9000, tinkeringwithcameras
 CAMERA; NEW 35-MILLIMETER FOR PROFESSIONALS, John Durniak, The New York Times, 25 August 1985
 CAMERA; CANON HAS ENTERED THE HIGH-TECH AGE, John Durniak, The New York Times, 12 January 1986
 70 years of Minolta, photoclubalpha.com
 9000.org, Magnus Wedberg

Bibliography 
Minolta 9000, LA Mannheim, Munich, Laterna Magica 1986. 
Minolta's camera technology. From the Nifacalette to Riva and Dynax, AR and J. Scheibel, G + G Urban 1990. 

9000
135 film cameras